Yaylabağ is a village in the Yayladere District, Bingöl Province, Turkey. The village is populated by Kurds of the Lertik tribe and had a population of 16 in 2021.

The hamlet of Karadiken is attached to the village.

References 

Villages in Yayladere District
Kurdish settlements in Bingöl Province